Lou Lopez Sénéchal is a French college basketball player for the UConn Huskies of the Big East Conference. She previously played for the Fairfield Stags and was named MAAC Player of the Year as a senior.

Early life and career 
Sénéchal was born to Carlos Lopez and Sophie Sénéchal in Guadalajara, Mexico. The family moved to Grenoble, France at the age of five. She attended high school in France but in 2017–18, she played basketball at the North Atlantic Basketball Academy in Ireland. Along with her stepfather, she communicated with schools throughout the US. They received some responses, so the family scheduled a trip to the states that offered for scholarships. The schools included UMass Lowell, Tulsa, Akron, Duquesne and Fairfield. The head coach at Fairfield, Joe Frager, planned a 45 minute workout to see what she could do. After only 10 minutes he indicated that the workout was over. She asked him what she had done wrong, he responded that she had done everything right. He had seen plenty of game film but wanted to see her in action to assess her personal attributes. He concluded she was open to being coached. Sénéchal accepted the offer and enrolled at Fairfield.

College career

Fairfield 
Lopez Sénéchal played for Fairfield University before transferring to UConn. She is 6-foot-1in tall and plays wing. 

In her freshman year, she sat for an interview with the Fairfield Mirror, the student newspaper at the school. She discussed the challenges of adapting to college in the United States after living in France most of her life. She played while basketball in France and Ireland, and noted that her teammates and friends were typically 25 years old or older, while she was now playing with teammates closer to her age.

By her senior year she was being described as "arguably the conference's best offense of player". That description followed a 26 point performance against Quinnipiac, leading to "a convincing 72-60 win"  by Fairfield over Quinnipiac on their home floor. At the time, Quinnipiac was the five-time regular-season champion of the MAAC.

At Fairfield, she led the team to an appearance in the NCAA tournament. Before the season started, the head coach of Fairfield, Joe Frager, had announced his retirement as of the end of the season. The team, led by Lopez Sénéchal, helped extend that retirement date as long as possible, winning their first conference title since 1998. That automatically qualified them for an NCAA tournament bid, their first such bid since 2001. They were seated 15th and faced second seed Texas, ranked seventh in the country. They arrived in Austin two days before the game and met for a team dinner, with players pointing out that it was the first such team dinner in a restaurant for two years due to COVID restrictions. 

In the first quarter of the game against Texas, the elbow of Texas's Lauren Ebo connected with Lopez Sénéchal's face. That sent Ebo to the foul line with the score 12–8 in favor of Texas. It also sent Lopez Sénéchal to the locker room where she received two stitches to close the cut. When asked about the incident after the game, “I think I got elbowed,” she said. “I got two stitches, and when I came back, I was all good.” She did not play the remainder of the first half. She returned in the second half, and hit a three pointer nine seconds into the second half.  Texas had outscored Fairfield by four points while Sénéchal was in the game in the first quarter, but Fairfield outscored Texas by three points in the second half, so Texas only outscored Fairfield by one point when Lopez Sénéchal was on the floor. Lopez Sénéchal hit her only two three-point attempts, scored on five of her six free throw attempts on her way to recording 17 points for the game.

UConn 
When Morgan Valley saw Sénéchal's name in the transfer portal, she had already heard the name "dozens of times". Fairfield is only an hour and 1/2 drive from the UConn campus, and Valley had discussions with a coach of a competing team about the challenges of stopping Sénéchal. When Valley saw the name in the portal, she immediately began doing some research viewing game films and reaching out to the Fairfield head coach, Joe Frager, to find out whether she would be a fit at UConn. Frager who has known UConn coach Auriemma for decades,  "understood the demands of the Huskies program" and responded that she would be "more than fine at UConn". Valley shared the video clips with Auriemma and the rest of the UConn staff which led to zoom meetings with Sénéchal while the UConn coaches were in Minneapolis for the Final Four.

At Fairfield, virtually all the scoring plays were run through her. The initial expectations were that Sénéchal would play more of a reserve role, and it was important that she feel comfortable with this change. Her goals were to get a shot at playing pro, and she felt that even a reduced role at UConn would provide the visibility and competition that would help earn a spot on a WNBA roster. While Auriemma originally expected he would get some minutes, he upgraded his opinion after a few days of practice. “After the first five days, I pretty much said, ‘Someone who was a starter isn’t going to start this year,’” Auriemma said. “That’s how impressive she was.”

Career statistics
Source

Awards and honors 

 MAAC Tournament MVP (2022)
 MAAC Player of the Year (2022)
 MAAC Rookie of the Year(2019)
 MAAC All-Academic Team (2020, 2021, 2022)
 First Team All-BIG EAST (2023)
 Big East All-Tournament team (2023)

References

External links
Fairfield Stags bio
UConn Huskies bio

Living people
Fairfield Stags women's basketball players
UConn Huskies women's basketball players
French women's basketball players
French expatriate basketball people in the United States
Sportspeople from Grenoble
French people of Mexican descent
French expatriate sportspeople in Ireland
Guards (basketball)
Forwards (basketball)
Year of birth missing (living people)